is a Japanese manga series written and illustrated by Yoko Nihonbashi. It was serialized in Shogakukan's seinen manga magazine Monthly Ikki from November 2000 to June 2003, with its chapters published in three tankōbon volumes. It is about two boys, Machizo and Tetsuo, who work together to create manga.

Plot
Machizo Sakaida's father is a successful manga artist. Machizo feels he is living under his father's shadow, and resents his father's success. Machizo recently transferred to Tetsuo's school. Tetsuo's friends start Tetsuo on reading Oretachi no Banka, a manga by Machizo's father, Daizō Sakai. A manga competition advertised in the magazine sets Tetsuo on redrawing manga, hoping to win some money to help pay his mother's hospitalization fees. Tetsuo's initial efforts are ruined by Machizo. Kumiko, a ruthless girl who adored Tetsuo, threatened Machizo to repay Tetsuo. Machizo's novel writing efforts were recognized by Tetsuo, and they end up working together to create a manga. In the meantime, it is revealed that Tetsuo's father had returned and was trying to end the publication of Oretachi no Banka. It is also revealed that a manga written by Tetsuo had caused his mother to fall ill, and that Daizō took possession of the aforementioned manga. Daizō describes his motivation as trying his best so that one day Tetsuo would return to creating manga.

Machizo and Tetsuo's manga is completed in the nick of time, with Machizo writing the story and Tetsuo drawing the graphics. Kumiko also advises Machizo on the plot details. They manage to receive the Special Merit Award. Daizō, as a judge of the competition, went up to present the prize to Tetsuo and Machizo, and remembering Tetsuo as his inspiration, hugged him before even realizing that Machizo was on stage as well. Tetsuo's father puts another handicap on both of them: they could not enter any collaborative works for the next competition, but had to create their own work. The death of Tetsuo's mother allows him freedom to create manga, and he begins to work on manga obsessively. Machizo, on the other hand, apprentices himself to another manga artist in order to learn the basics of making manga.

Publication
G Senjō Heaven's Door is written and illustrated by Yoko Nihonbashi. It began in the first issue of Shogakukan's Spirits Zōkan Ikki (re-branded as Monthly Ikki in 2003), released on November 30, 2000. The series finished on June 25, 2003. Shogakukan published its chapters in three tankōbon volumes, released from March 29 to September 30, 2003. A 3-volume "Complete Edition" was published by Shogakukan between August 12 and October 12, 2016.

Volume list

Reception
G Senjō Heaven's Door was one of the Jury Recommended Works at the 7th Japan Media Arts Festival in 2003.

See also
Shojo Fight, another manga series by the same author

References

Further reading

External links

2003 manga
Coming-of-age anime and manga
Manga creation in anime and manga
Seinen manga
Shogakukan manga